Valiyaran (also Romanized as Valīyārān and Valyārān; also known as Valgaran and Walgaran) is a village in Qareh Poshtelu-e Bala Rural District, Qareh Poshtelu District, Zanjan County, Zanjan Province, Iran. At the 2006 census, its population was 605, in 132 families.

References 

Populated places in Zanjan County